Puotila (Finnish), Botby gård (Swedish) is an eastern neighborhood of Helsinki, Finland.

Politics
Results of the 2011 Finnish parliamentary election in Puotila:

Social Democratic Party   24.5%
National Coalition Party   19.9%
True Finns   15.6%
Green League   14.2%
Left Alliance   10.0%
Swedish People's Party   6.2%
Centre Party   4.1%
Christian Democrats   2.9%

Neighbourhoods of Helsinki